Christine Mary Crawley, Baroness Crawley FRSA (born 9 January 1950) is a British politician for the Labour Party.

Early life
Crawley was educated at the Notre Dame High School School in Plymouth before going to Digby Stuart College (University of Roehampton) to train as a teacher. After graduation she began teaching children aged between 9 and 15, and also ran the local youth theatre.

Political career
Her work to gain funding for the youth theatre brought her into contact with local politicians, and she became involved in politics, joining the Labour Party. Soon after joining the party she became secretary of the local branch, and then Social Secretary for the local Women's Branch. She was elected as a District Councillor for the South Oxfordshire District Council, at a time when the Labour Party was a minority party on the council.

In 1983, she ran for a seat in the House of Commons but was not elected, instead spending a year working on local issues before she was elected as a Member of the European Parliament (MEP) for the Birmingham East constituency). As an MEP Crawley was active on the Committee on Women's Rights and Gender Equality and helped push their Maternity Leave Directive through, becoming Chair of that committee in 1989. She stepped down as an MEP in   1999, and is now a member of the West Midlands Regional Assembly and a sponsor of the National Women's Network. 

She was Chair of the Women's National Commission between 1999 and 2001, and in 1998 was created Baroness Crawley, of Edgbaston in the County of West Midlands. Between 2002 and 2008 she served as a Party Whip in the House of Lords. She is a member of Labour Friends of Israel.

Honours
In 2013, Baroness Crawley was awarded an Honorary Doctorate of Health from Plymouth University

Personal life
The ancient historian Josephine Crawley Quinn is her daughter.

References

External links
Profile at New Statesman

1950 births
Living people
Alumni of the University of Roehampton
British Roman Catholics
British people of Irish descent
Councillors in Oxfordshire
Labour Party (UK) Baronesses- and Lords-in-Waiting
Labour Party (UK) life peers
Life peeresses created by Elizabeth II
Labour Party (UK) MEPs
Labour Friends of Israel
MEPs for England 1984–1989
MEPs for England 1989–1994
MEPs for England 1994–1999
People from Birmingham, West Midlands
Place of birth missing (living people)
20th-century women MEPs for England
Women councillors in England